Samuel Price (July 28, 1805February 25, 1884) was Virginia lawyer and politician, who helped to establish the state of West Virginia during the American Civil War and became Lieutenant Governor, and later a United States senator.

Early and family life
Born in Fauquier County, Virginia, Price moved with his parents to Preston County (now in West Virginia) in 1815. He received a preparatory training and read law.

Career
Admitted to the Virginia bar in 1832, Price began practicing law in Nicholas and Braxton Counties. He was elected Nicholas county clerk in 1830 and Commonwealth Attorney in 1833. He owned slaves.

Voters elected Price to the Virginia House of Delegates, where he represented Nicholas County part time from 1834 to 1836, then moved to Wheeling, Virginia (now West Virginia) in 1836 and to Lewisburg, Virginia (now West Virginia) in 1838. He was prosecuting attorney for Braxton County from 1836 to 1850 and represented Braxton County in the Virginia House of Delegates from 1847 to 1850 and again in 1852.

Price was a delegate to the Virginia Constitutional Convention of 1850, and the Virginia Secession Convention of 1861 where he voted against secession. In 1863 he was elected the fifth Lieutenant Governor of Virginia and served until the close of the Civil War.

He was a delegate to the constitutional convention of West Virginia in 1872 and was its president. He was appointed as a Democrat to the U.S. Senate to fill the vacancy caused by the death of Allen T. Caperton and served from August 26, 1876, to January 26, 1877, when a successor was elected. He was an unsuccessful candidate in 1876 for election to fill the vacancy.

Death and legacy
In 1884. Price died in Lewisburg. Interment was in the Stuart Burying Ground at Stuart Manor, near Lewisburg.

The Gov. Samuel Price House at Lewisburg was listed on the National Register of Historic Places in 1975.

External Links
West Virginia & Regional History Center at West Virginia University, Samuel Price, Lawyer and Politician, Papers

References

1805 births
1884 deaths
People from Fauquier County, Virginia
American people of Welsh descent
Democratic Party United States senators from West Virginia
Lieutenant Governors of Virginia
Democratic Party members of the Virginia House of Delegates
County and city Commonwealth's Attorneys in Virginia
County clerks in Virginia
Virginia lawyers
West Virginia lawyers
American slave owners
People from Braxton County, West Virginia
People from Lewisburg, West Virginia
People from Nicholas County, West Virginia
People from Preston County, West Virginia
19th-century American politicians
19th-century American lawyers
People of West Virginia in the American Civil War
United States senators who owned slaves